Al-Fathel is a neighborhood of Baghdad, Iraq. 

Fathel